Turning Point (alternative title "Dying To Go To School") is a 2009 documentary film by Richard Stanley Productions and the FIA Foundation for the Automobile and Society.

The documentary features Michelle Yeoh ("Global Ambassador for the Make Roads Safe campaign") while she "advocates for road injury to be recognised as a global public health and development priority".

The documentary follows her to South Africa, Malaysia, Vietnam and other countries.

References

External links
The film wholly available to be watched on its Official Homepage
Chinese toddler left for dead in hit-and-run crash dies

Make Roads Safe Official Homepage

Documentary films about road transport
Road safety campaigns
2009 films